Bağtala is a village in the municipality of Uzuntala in the Qakh Rayon of Azerbaijan. According to Azerbaijan's State Statistics Committee, only nine people lived in the village as of 2014.

References

Populated places in Qakh District